The 2007–08 Luge World Cup was a multi race series over a season for luge. The season started on 16 November 2007 and ended on 17 February 2008. The World Cup is organised by the FIL.

Calendar

Standings

Men's singles

Men's doubles

Women's singles

Team Relay

Luge World Cup
2007 in luge
2008 in luge